Michael Gisler (born August 26, 1969) is a former American football offensive lineman. Gisler was selected in the eleventh round by the New Orleans Saints out of the University of Houston in the 1992 NFL Draft and played seven seasons in the National Football League (NFL) for the New England Patriots and the New York Jets.

References

1969 births
Living people
American football offensive linemen
Houston Cougars football players
New England Patriots players
New York Jets players
People from Karnes County, Texas